George Abercromby or Abercrombie may refer to:

George Abercromby, 3rd Baron Abercromby (1800–1852), Scottish soldier, politician and peer
George Abercromby, 2nd Baron Abercromby (1770–1843), Scottish lawyer, politician and peer
George Abercromby, 4th Baron Abercromby (1838–1917), Scottish peer and politician
Sir George Abercromby, 8th Baronet (1886–1964), Lord-Lieutenant of Banffshire
George Francis Abercrombie (1896–1978), British physician